Aluminum bat may refer to:

Aluminum baseball bat
Aluminium cricket bat